Maccabi Haifa Wild Boars (previously known simply as Haifa Rugby or Wild Boars) is one of the eight clubs affiliated to Rugby Israel. Based in Haifa, in the northern part of Israel. 

The team is part of Maccabi Haifa.

Club history
The club was formed by Alan Brazg, a student in the Technion, in the year 1971 and consisted mostly of immigrants from South Africa. The club was one of the first to bring rugby union to Israel, when the Israeli union was formed in 1972.

Lady Wild Boars
Erez Weiss, a Haifa men’s player, promoted the birth of a women's rugby union team. With his enthusiasm, a team was formed in 2005 which included 7 team members and was coached by Menachem Ben Menachem and Nir Bar Or (2005/2006). Then, Yael Kenan took over as coach (2006/2007) and is still the team coach today (2009/2010). 

Haifa women's team, also known as The Haifa Lady Boars, won the Yizrael 7's tournament in 2007 and came in first place in the rugby tournament of Eilat games 2009. The team is playing in the Israeli Rugby League and has been ranked second for the last four years.

Playing Grounds
Maccabi Haifa Wild Boars' Home pitch is the Curly Krieger Stadium in Neve Sha'anan, Haifa.

Current squad

Team Legends

External links
 Club website
 Haifa Lady Wild Boars
 Fan Site

Israeli rugby union teams
Technion – Israel Institute of Technology